Corinthian Yacht Club may refer to:

 Bahia Corinthian Yacht Club, Newport Beach, California, United States
 Corinthian Sailing Club, Dallas, Texas, United States
 Corinthian Yacht Club, Marblehead, Massachusetts, United States.
 Corinthian Yacht Club of Cape May, New Jersey, United States. 
 Corinthian Yacht Club of Philadelphia, Pennsylvania, United States
 Chicago Corinthian Yacht Club, Chicago, Illinois, United States
 Dallas Corinthian Yacht Club, Oak Point, Texas, United States
 Essex Corinthian Yacht Club, Essex, Connecticut, United States
 Royal Corinthian Yacht Club, Burnham-on-Crouch, United Kingdom
 Seawanhaka Corinthian Yacht Club, Oyster Bay, New York, United States
 Yale Corinthian Yacht Club of Yale University, United States
 Corinthian Yacht Club, Tiburon, California, United States
 Forth Corinthian Yacht Club, Granton, Edinburgh, Scotland. Established 1880. Motto ‘Affordable sailing for all’